Stitches is a 2019 Serbian drama film directed by Miroslav Terzić. It is based on a true story.

Cast
 Snežana Bogdanović - Ana
  - Jovan
 Jovana Stojiljković - Ivana

References

External links 
 
 

Serbian drama films
Films set in Serbia
2019 drama films
2010s Serbian-language films